= Mohat railway station =

Railway station in Pakistan

Coordinates: 30.425338°N 66.996175°E

General information
- Owner: Ministry of Railways

Other information
- Station code: MHTA

History
- Former names: Great Indian Peninsula Railway
Location

Mohat railway station (Urdu: موہت ریلوے اسٹیشن) is located in Pakistan.

== See also ==
- List of railway stations in Pakistan
- Pakistan Railways
